Scheid is a village in the municipality of Tomils, Hinterrhein, Switzerland.

Scheid may also refer to:

Scheid (surname)
Scheid, Rhineland-Palatinate, German municipality in the district of Vulkaneifel

See also
Scheidt, Rhineland-Palatinate